Andrea De Marchi (Montebelluna, 19 November 1988) is a retired Italian rugby union player. His usual position was as a Prop, and he represented Italy on 2 occasions.

After the experience with Aironi, from 2012 to 2018, he played for Zebre. 

In 2009, 2010 and 2013 De Marchi was named in the Italy A squad for annual World Rugby Nations Cup and he represented Italy on 2 occasions, in 2014.

References

External links
ESPN Profile

1988 births
Living people
Italian rugby union players
Italy international rugby union players
Rugby union props
People from Montebelluna
Zebre Parma players
Sportspeople from the Province of Treviso
Aironi players